The 1992 Nigerian Senate election in Benue State was held on July 4, 1992, to elect members of the Nigerian Senate to represent Benue State. Iyorchia Ayu representing Benue North-West, Ameh Ebute representing Benue South and David Iornem representing Benue North-East all won on the platform of the Social Democratic Party.

Overview

Summary

Results

Benue North-West 
The election was won by Iyorchia Ayu of the Social Democratic Party.

Benue South 
The election was won by Ameh Ebute of the Social Democratic Party.

Benue North-East 
The election was won by David Iornem of the Social Democratic Party.

References 

Ben
Benue State Senate elections
July 1992 events in Nigeria